Hans-Christian Hausenberg (born 18 September 1998) is an Estonian decathlete and long jumper.

On 1 March 2015, he set a world U18 record in heptathlon (indoor). Since 2017, he detains the European under-20 record in heptathlon. He won the long jump qualification with 7.98 m (w) at 2019 European Athletics U23 Championships, but finished fourth in final. He won a bronze medal in decathlon at 2015 World Youth Championships in Cali and silver medal in pole vault at 2013 European Youth Summer Olympic Festival.
He has also broken several national junior records.

International competitions

References

External links

1998 births
Estonian decathletes
Athletes (track and field) at the 2014 Summer Youth Olympics
Sportspeople from Tartu
Living people
European Games competitors for Estonia
Athletes (track and field) at the 2019 European Games